Stephen Robert Addazio (born June 1, 1959) is an American football coach and former player. He currently is the offensive line coach for Texas A&M University. Addazio served as the head football coach at Temple University from 2011 to 2012, Boston College from 2013 to 2019, and Colorado State University from 2020 to 2021. Prior to his stint at Temple, Addazio spent six seasons as an offensive line coach, assistant head coach, and offensive coordinator of the Florida Gators football team and was a part of two BCS National Championship Game-winning coaching staffs under head coach Urban Meyer.

College career
Addazio was a four-year starter at Central Connecticut from 1978 to 1981 and earned tryouts with the NFL's New England Patriots, USFL's Jacksonville Bulls and CFL's Ottawa Rough Riders.  He earned his bachelor's (1981) and master's (1985) degrees from Central Connecticut.

Coaching career

High school coaching career
Addazio was the head coach of Cheshire High School in Connecticut from 1988 to 1994. Over twenty of his high school players earned places on the roster of college football programs.  He led Cheshire to forty-nine consecutive victories, the second-longest streak in the nation.  Cheshire also won three consecutive state titles and was ranked in the top twenty-five high school football teams in the country under Addazio.

Assistant college coach
Starting in 1995, Addazio moved up to the college football ranks and had stints as a position coach with Syracuse, Notre Dame, and Indiana.  During 2004, he was offensive coordinator at Indiana during Gerry DiNardo's last season.  In 2005, Addazio joined Urban Meyer's staff at Florida.  Addazio and Meyer had previously coached together at Notre Dame during the 1999 and 2000 seasons under head coach Bob Davie. Addazio reportedly completed the logistical work to bring Aaron Hernandez to Florida.

With the announcement of Urban Meyer's resignation as the Gators' head coach on December 7, 2010, Addazio's future with the Gators came into question.  On December 11, 2010, it was announced that Will Muschamp had accepted the head coach position for the Florida Gators.

Temple (2011–2012)
On December 23, 2010, it was announced that Addazio accepted the head coaching job at Temple, following Al Golden's resignation as the Owls' head coach to become the new head coach of the Miami Hurricanes football program.

Addazio achieved an impressive 9–4 record and secured a victory at the 2011 New Mexico Bowl in his first season with the Owls. However, Temple transitioned to the tougher Big East Conference during the offseason, which forced just a 4–7 finish without bowl eligibility in the following year.

Boston College (2013–2019)
On December 4, 2012, Boston College hired Addazio as its new football coach, following the firing of Frank Spaziani who coached the Eagles for four years to a 21–29 record.

2013
Following a dismal 2–10 season under Spaziani, Addazio made an immediate impact in his first year as Head Coach of the Eagles. The team improved to 7–6 and secured a bowl appearance in the Independence Bowl; the program's first since 2010.

The feature component of Addazio's run-heavy offense, senior running back Andre Williams emerged as a standout player and rushed for 2,177 yards on the year. The mark earned him a top-10 spot on the all-time NCAA record list for most rushing yards in a season, and the Doak Walker Award as the best running back in the country. Williams finished 4th place in the Heisman Trophy voting and was also a Walter Camp Award finalist.

2014
Addazio coached the Eagles to an identical 7–6 record in his second season at the helm. Led by graduate transfer quarterback Tyler Murphy, who rushed for over 1,000 yards on the year, the Eagles secured their second straight bowl appearance at the 2014 Pinstripe Bowl. The highlight of the season came on September 13, as the Eagles upset the #9 ranked USC Trojans at home.

2015
Addazio and Boston College suffered a setback in 2015, as the Eagles finished with a 3–9 record and went winless in the ACC. On November 21, they faced off against rival Notre Dame at Fenway Park in Boston as a part of Notre Dame's Shamrock Series.

2016
In his fourth year with the Eagles, Addazio got back on track with a 7–6 record and a bowl game victory at the 2016 Quick Lane Bowl. The win was the Eagles' first postseason victory since 2007.

2017
Addazio's fifth season again saw the team finish with a 7–6 record, with the team earning a bowl appearance at the 2017 Pinstripe Bowl. On November 18, the Eagles appeared in a game played at Fenway Park, where they defeated the UConn Huskies.

2018
The 2018 campaign was a mixed bag for the Eagles and Addazio. Despite a 7–5 record, the season saw Boston College's return to the top-25 rankings for the first time since 2009. Additionally, a bowl appearance at the 2018 First Responder Bowl would have given them the opportunity for an 8th victory (and to break the 7–6 trend). However, the game was called off during the first quarter due to severe lightning strikes and ultimately ruled a no-contest.

The Eagles broke into the rankings twice during the year, the first occurrence coming after a strong 3–0 start earned them #23 in the country. However, they quickly dropped back out after a loss to unranked Purdue. Not ones to resign, Boston College won three of their following four games and regained a ranking of No. 24. They improved to No. 17 after a road victory against Virginia Tech, then faced off against rival and No. 2 ranked Clemson. A tough loss against the Tigers dropped the Eagles down to No. 22, and a further upset loss against unranked Florida State pushed them out of the top-25 entirely. Their final game of the season against rival and No. 19 ranked Syracuse was the Eagles' last chance to re-enter the polls, however they dropped the matchup in a disappointing three-game skid to end the season.
 
On December 18, 2018, perhaps due to the Eagles promising signs of returning to national relevance, Addazio signed a contract extension through 2020, extending his previous six-year deal by two years.

2019
In Addazio's final year with Boston College, the Eagles finished the regular season with a lackluster 6–6 record, making bowl eligibility on their final game of the season. Despite a relatively weak early schedule, they failed to meet the previous year's aspirations of improvement upon or at least meeting the achievement of a top-25 ranking. As a result, Addazio was fired on December 1, 2019, before the team's bowl game appearance at the Birmingham Bowl.

The lone highlight of the season was running-back A. J. Dillon achieving a school record for career rushing yards at 4,382 in just three seasons.

Colorado State (2020–2021)
Ten days after his firing from Boston College, Addazio was hired as the head coach at Colorado State University to replace Mike Bobo.

2020
Addazio's first year with the Rams would be mired by the COVID-19 pandemic, as the schedule was reduced to just eight games. However, only half of them would be played due to virus protocols. In the short season, the team achieved just a 1–3 record.

2021
Returning to a full-season schedule, second-year coach Addazio led the Rams to just a 3–9 record. After starting the year 3–3, the team lost its final six games and did not achieve bowl eligibility. Addazio was ejected during the first half of the final game of the season against Nevada, by rule after receiving two unsportsmanlike conduct penalties; he is just the second coach to be ejected following the NCAA rule change implemented in 2016.

Addazio was fired on December 2, 2021, after two seasons at Colorado State where he posted a total record of 4–12.

Texas A&M (2022–2022)
On January 21, 2022, Addazio was hired by Texas A&M to be their offensive line coach under Jimbo Fisher.

DazQuest
On October 10, 2018, the Boston College satirical newspaper The New England Classic released DazQuest, an Addazio-themed video game. Created with the interactive fiction software Twine, the game allows players to assume the role of Addazio as he embarks on a comedic adventure to retrieve the stolen campus statue of Doug Flutie. The game also features cameos from other real-life Boston College personnel such as hockey coach Jerry York, athletic director Martin Jarmond, and campus mascot Baldwin the Eagle. DazQuest's creators have said they looked to other comedy/adventure games such as The Secret of Monkey Island and Undertale as inspiration for their game, and on October 14 it received a five-star review from the student newspaper The Heights.

Head coaching record

College

Notes

References

External links
 Texas A&M profile
 Boston College profile

1959 births
Living people
Boston College Eagles football coaches
Central Connecticut Blue Devils football players
Colorado State Rams football coaches
Florida Gators football coaches
Indiana Hoosiers football coaches
Notre Dame Fighting Irish football coaches
Syracuse Orange football coaches
Temple Owls football coaches
Texas A&M Aggies football coaches
Western Connecticut State Colonials football coaches
High school football coaches in Connecticut
People from Farmington, Connecticut
Coaches of American football from Connecticut
Players of American football from Connecticut